Salem Abu Siam (born 8 March 1983 in Lod) is an Arab-Israeli professional association football player who currently plays for Shimshon Kafr Qasim and is former Under-21 international.

Career

Youth career
Salem was part of the youth side at Maccabi Tel Aviv that won two straight championship titles as well as a cup title. It was inevitable that he would be promoted to the first side where he eventually received a starting role.

Maccabi Tel Aviv
While in his first season at Maccabi Tel Aviv, they won a league championship and in his third season, Abu Siam was playing in the UEFA Champions League. Abu Siam, although as a Beduin belongs to a group not totally identified with the Arab community and therefore is not exactly of the same ethnic background as other Arab Israeli footballers such as Salim Tuama, Salah Hasarma or Abbas Suan, often had to turn the other cheek to racist remarks shouted at those players (or occasionally at him) by Maccabi fans, who are known for their often flagrantly personally offensive chants, and are often ranked highest on the Israeli press's tally for most racist fan community.

Bnei Yehuda Tel Aviv
At the beginning of the 2006–07 season Abu Siam made the eyebrow-raising decision to sign with one of Mac TA's crosstown rivals, Bnei Yehuda Tel Aviv, a club with a fanatical fanbase smaller than Maccabi's, but more violent. Although at the beginning of the season the fans ridiculed the decision to sign the club's first Arab player, the furor soon died down, which came to a surprise following similar affairs with Beitar Jerusalem that had occurred in 2005 and 2006 in regards to efforts to sign Muslim Nigerian player Ndala Ibrahim.

Hapoel Petah Tikva
Abu Siam signed a one-year contract with Hapoel Petah Tikva in October 2009.

Statistics

External links

1983 births
Living people
Bedouin Israelis
Arab citizens of Israel
Arab-Israeli footballers
Israeli footballers
Israel under-21 international footballers
Maccabi Tel Aviv F.C. players
Bnei Yehuda Tel Aviv F.C. players
Hapoel Acre F.C. players
Hapoel Petah Tikva F.C. players
Hapoel Bnei Lod F.C. players
Liga Leumit players
Israeli Premier League players
Footballers from Lod
Association football fullbacks